Karl Gustav Herbert Freij (17 March 1922 – 4 August 1973) was a Swedish wrestler. He competed in the Greco-Roman lightweight (−67 kg) category at the 1948, 1952 and 1960 Olympics and finished in first, second and third place, respectively. He missed the 1956 Games due to an injury.

After retiring from competitions Freij worked at the Allhems printing plant in Malmö. He died of cancer, aged 51. A memorial wrestling tournament is held in Sweden in his honor. His nephew Leif Freij also became an Olympic wrestler.

References

External links
 

1922 births
1973 deaths
Olympic wrestlers of Sweden
Wrestlers at the 1948 Summer Olympics
Wrestlers at the 1952 Summer Olympics
Wrestlers at the 1960 Summer Olympics
Swedish male sport wrestlers
Olympic gold medalists for Sweden
Olympic silver medalists for Sweden
Olympic bronze medalists for Sweden
Olympic medalists in wrestling
World Wrestling Championships medalists
Medalists at the 1960 Summer Olympics
Medalists at the 1952 Summer Olympics
Medalists at the 1948 Summer Olympics
Sportspeople from Malmö
20th-century Swedish people